Bartolomeus Jozef Lodewijk Rosalia "Bart" Somers (born 12 May 1964 in Mechelen) is a Belgian, Flemish politician. He is currently the mayor of Mechelen and President of the Alliance of Liberals and Democrats for Europe in the European Committee of the Regions. In 2017, Bart Somers was awarded 2016 World Mayor Prize as recognition for his outstanding achievements in welcoming refugees during recent years and for the long-term integration of immigrants from different cultures, religions and social backgrounds. He obtained a law degree from the Katholieke Universiteit Leuven.

Political career 
Bart Somers is the son of the former People's Union parliamentarian, Joos Somers, who was notably a deputy and a senator. After a law degree at KU Leuven, Bart Somers went through the Volksunie before joining the Open VLD in 1992.

Between 2003 and 2004, he was the Minister-President of Flanders.

After the regional elections of June 2004 he was appointed the interim chairman of the Flemish Liberals and Democrats (VLD). On 4 December 2004, he was elected with just over 50 percent of the vote to a full term as chairman.

Bart Somers was one of the three negotiators for the Open VLD during the 2007 Belgian government formation.

After his party's defeat in the regional elections of 2009, he resigned as chairman of the Flemish Liberals and Democrats.

In June 2016, the European Committee of the Regions adopted Bart Somers report on "Combatting Radicalisation and Violent Extremism: Prevention mechanisms at local and regional level". His opinion won cross-party support for its calls for more effective policing, for more cooperation between local, regional, national and European authorities, and for an approach based on respect for core principles.

In October 2016, Bart Somers was elected as Leader of the Alliance of Liberals and Democrats for Europe in the European Committee of the Regions.

In February 2017, he received the "World Mayor Prize 2016", an election for the year's best mayor in the world.

In October 2019, he became Vice minister-president of the Flemish Government and Flemish Minister for Living Together and Domestic Administration in the Jambon Government.

Personal life 
He was formerly married to Miet Bourlon (currently divorced) and he has two children, a girl Lieze and a boy Jan Klaas.

References

External links
 
 
 ALDE Group in the European Committee of the Regions (official website)

|-

|-

1964 births
Flemish politicians
KU Leuven alumni
Living people
Members of the Belgian Federal Parliament
Mayors of Mechelen
Ministers-President of Flanders
Open Vlaamse Liberalen en Democraten politicians
21st-century Belgian politicians